Men's 200m races for amputee athletes at the 2004 Summer Paralympics were held in the Athens Olympic Stadium. Events were held in three disability classes.

T42
The T42 event consisted of a single race. It was won by Wojtek Czyz, representing .

Final Round
25 Sept. 2004, 18:15

T44
The T44 event consisted of 2 heats and a final. It was won by Oscar Pistorius, representing .

1st Round

Heat 1
20 Sept. 2004, 17:30

Heat 2
20 Sept. 2004, 17:36

Final Round
21 Sept. 2004, 18:05

T46
The T46 event consisted of 2 heats and a final. It was won by Antônio Souza, representing .

1st Round

Heat 1
19 Sept. 2004, 17:15

Heat 2
19 Sept. 2004, 17:21

Final Round
20 Sept. 2004, 17:45

References

M